The mass media in Brunei are strictly controlled by the government under Sultan Hassanal Bolkiah, which has effectively imposed martial law in the country since the Brunei Revolt of 1962. News coverage consists of police-beat reporting, lifestyle features, and community events, with little in the way of diverse viewpoints. Reporters Without Borders reports there is "virtually no criticism of the government". The liberal democracy watchdog Freedom House lists Brunei's media as "not free".

The privately owned press, Brunei Press Sdn Bhd, publisher of the Borneo Bulletin, is controlled by the sultan's family. Reporters and editors exercise self-censorship on political and religious matters.

A press law provides prison terms of up to three years for reporting "false news".

History

The newspaper industry in Brunei only began after the 1950s. Before 1950, there was no other publication in Brunei other than the Annual Reports which are published by the British Colonial Office. The first other regular government publication was the Government Gazette which was first published in 1951. However the gazette was not strictly a newspaper, but an official publication for the government.

The first newspaper to appear was Salam Seria published in 1952 by the British Malayan Petroleum Company, the forerunner to today's Brunei Shell Petroleum Company. Being an official company publication, it delivered news and information to its staff as well as the general public regarding its oil exploration and other company news. Even though it was produced bilingually in English and Malay, the Malay version had added content of world news and educational materials. Salam Seria became Salam the year after and had remained until now. Salam remains a free publication.

The second newspaper is today's Borneo Bulletin which first appeared on November 7, 1953. This English weekly publication was printed in Kuala Belait by the Brunei Press Company which was formed in October 1953. Borneo Bulletin was sold for 20 cents when it was first produced. At first most of its news concentrated on news in Borneo with special emphasis on Brunei. Its first publication run of about 3,500 was the largest in Borneo then.

In 1959, the founders of Borneo Bulletin sold the press and newspaper to the Straits Times of Singapore. The first Bulletins were published with different covers for the three different editions for Brunei, Sabah, and Sarawak. Publication rose to about 10,000 by 1957 but was reduced to about 6,000 in 1970 as a result of both Sarawak and Sabah being incorporated in Malaysia. However, by 1983, production had increased to about 30,000 before gradually reducing to about 10,000 by 1997.

In 1985, Brunei's first public listed company, QAF, took over part of the shares of Brunei Press from the Straits Times. By September 1990, the Borneo Bulletin became a daily newspaper. At present, the circulation per issue averages 20,000 copies daily while the weekend and Sunday edition average 25,000 copies.

The third publication is the Government's Pelita Brunei' which was first published in 1956. Pelita Brunei's first issue on 15 February 1956 had His Majesty Sultan Haji Omar Ali Saifuddien Saadul Khairi Waddien's speech inaugurating the publication of the newspaper.

In 1957, Pelita Brunei was produced twice monthly and was at first produced using A4 size paper before increasing in size to 9 inches by 14 inches in 1959. It was not until July 1965 before Pelita Brunei became a weekly newspaper published every Wednesday and remained so until now.

In the beginning, there were only about 1,000 being printed by the 1990s, more than 45,000 Pelita Brunei was printed weekly becoming the largest print publication in the country. The content of the newspaper increased from about 4 pages to about 24 pages now and with a second part being added to it containing all the government job vacancies and tenders being awarded in the government as well as other interesting features and articles.

A fourth publication was a short-lived one called the Berita Brunei which was first published in March 1957. It was printed in Malay and also partly in Jawi. It was a weekly publication and was published every Thursday and sold for about 10 cents each with a print run of about 5,000. By July 1958, the Jawi was dropped and by October 1959 it was renamed Berita Borneo. However, the newly named Berita Borneo only lasted for 5 editions and the last publication was in December 1958 with the editor citing the drop in advertisements from Malaysia and Singapore as the main reason for its demise.

In April 1958, another publication in Jawi started called Malaysia, printed by the Budaya Press. Sold for about 20 cents each, it too died by September 1958.

A publication by a former political party called Suara Bakti was published in October 1961 and came out every Friday was the sixth newspaper in Brunei. It dubbed itself "the largest weekly newspaper in North Kalimantan" and sold for 20 cents each. However, the newspaper came out sporadically and by December 1961 it only had about 10 editions. A new editor took over and that too lasted for only about 5 editions before closing down in January 1962.

A seventh publication called Bintang Harian and The Daily Star published in both Malay and English first appeared in March 1966. It appeared every day except Sunday and cost about 15 cents. More than 10,000 copies were printed daily as it was published not just for Brunei, but also for Sabah and Sarawak, West Malaysia, and Singapore. When it stopped publication in January 1971, more than 15,000 copies were printed. The publication stopped when the publisher, The Star Press became a subsidiary of The Brunei Press.

Two other government publications, Brunei Darussalam Newsletter and the Brunei Darussalam Daily Digest were published in October 1985 and January 1990 respectively. The former continued being published, but its readership was mostly made up of foreign readers, and it was seldom seen by local readers. The latter stopped, but efforts are in place to revive its publication.

Media Permata was the latest of a number of local Malay newspaper when it began in January 1995 as a weekly paper focusing on local news and features for the Malay literate. It was relaunched as a daily newspaper in July 1998 and remained so until today with an average of 10,000 copies of Media Permata being circulated. Media Permata is available from Monday to Friday and a weekend edition is also available for Saturday and Sunday.

The last newspaper to appear before The Brunei Times was the News Express. It started when the 20th Southeast Asian Games were hosted in Bandar Seri Begawan towards the later end of 1999. By early 2001, it too joined the ranks of other newspapers that were unable to sustain themselves in Brunei's competitive newspaper market.

Newspapers
There are three local newspapers currently circulating in Brunei:
BruDirect.com 
Brunei No.1 News Website. An online newspaper and the largest online media information tool, and a pioneer in the field of online media in Brunei Darussalam. The website has an audience of 70,000 to 80,000 visits per day.
Pelita Brunei 
A free bi-weekly Malay-language newspaper published by the government's Information Department. Circulation is around 40,000.
Borneo Bulletin 
The sultanate's first English-language daily, published by Brunei Press Sdn Bhd. Circulates around 20,000 on weekdays, 25,000 copies on Saturday and Sunday, including the New Straits Times from Malaysia, The Straits Times from Singapore and The New York Times International Edition.
Media Permata 
The sole Malay-language daily, it is published by Brunei Press Sdn Bhd. Circulation is around 10,000.

Meanwhile, there was also one defunct newspaper:
The Brunei Times 
An English-language broadsheet daily started in 2006 until 2016. Its outlook is more international than the Bulletin, which is focused on community news. It circulates around 10,000 copies. In 2011, 15,500 copies (Source: Publisher Data).
Foreign newspapers are also widely circulated in Brunei.

Broadcasting
Domestic radio and television in Brunei comes under the auspices of the national broadcaster, Radio Television Brunei (RTB) and KRISTALfm, the country's only commercial radio station which ended the monopoly of radio in 1999. The latter was operated by KRISTAL Media Sdn Bhd, a subsidiary of the DataStream Technology DevCo Group of companies, which is currently headquartered at Jalan Tungku Link. Established on 2nd January 1999, KRISTALfm transmits on frequency 90.7 MHz in the Brunei-Muara District & parts of Tutong from Bukit Subok, and 98.7 MHz in the Belait District & other parts of Tutong from Andulau. Foreign programming was also available via a Direct Broadcast Satellite Pay TV service via the Malaysian satellite TV service, Astro, which was also available in Brunei under the brand Kristal-Astro up to 2022. Indonesian TV channels such as TVRI, RCTI, SCTV and others are also available in Brunei by Brunei and Indonesian audiences with renting or buying the digital satellite receiver.

Internet
There appear to be no restrictions on Internet use in Brunei, although Freedom House reports a local forum, BruneiTalk, was blocked in 2003 after contributors discussed the business dealings of senior officials. As of June 2006, it appeared the site was attempting to move to a different server.

See also
Brunei
Communications in Brunei

References

External links
 The Brunei Times
 Brunei Press Sdn Bhd
 Radio Television Brunei
 Brunei Information Department
 Free press report by the Freedom House

 
Brunei
Brunei